Lorenzo Perez Escalona (born February 4, 1986) is a Cuban Paralympic swimmer. He competed in the 2012 Paralympic Games in London where he won a silver and a bronze medal for the 50 and 100 m freestyle respectively.  Escalona also one a gold medal at the 2015 Parapan American Games in the 100m freestyle. He has also competed in the 400m freestyle.

References

1986 births
Living people
Paralympic swimmers of Cuba
S6-classified Paralympic swimmers
Paralympic gold medalists for Cuba
Paralympic silver medalists for Cuba
Paralympic bronze medalists for Cuba
Cuban male freestyle swimmers
Paralympic medalists in swimming
Medalists at the 2012 Summer Paralympics
Medalists at the 2016 Summer Paralympics
Swimmers at the 2012 Summer Paralympics
Swimmers at the 2016 Summer Paralympics
Medalists at the 2011 Parapan American Games
Medalists at the 2015 Parapan American Games
Medalists at the 2019 Parapan American Games
People from Granma Province